Barton's cichlid (Nosferatu bartoni) is a species of cichlid freshwater fish endemic to the Laguna Media Luna and headwaters of the Río Verde between  above sea level in the state of San Luis Potosí, Mexico. Its range is a part of the upper Panuco River basin. It can also be found in the aquarium trade. It shares its distribution with the related Nosferatu labridens. Barton's cichlid is endangered due to habitat loss, pollution and introduced species.

The common and specific names of the Barton's cichlid honours the author, Tarleton Hoffman Bean's brother, Barton Appler Bean (1860–1947), who was assistant curator of Ichthyology at the United States National Museum.

References

Cichlid fish of Central America
Freshwater fish of Mexico
Endemic fish of Mexico
Pánuco River
Natural history of San Luis Potosí
Natural history of Tamaulipas
Natural history of Veracruz
Endangered fish
Endangered biota of Mexico
Endangered fauna of North America
Taxa named by Tarleton Hoffman Bean
Fish described in 1892
Taxonomy articles created by Polbot
Barton's cichlid